The legislative district of San Juan–Mandaluyong was the combined representation of the Metropolitan Manila municipalities (now highly urbanized cities) of Mandaluyong and San Juan in the Regular Batasang Pambansa (1984–1986) and the lower house of the Congress of the Philippines (1987–1995).

Since 1995, each has been represented separately through the lone congressional districts of Mandaluyong and San Juan.

History

Prior to gaining joint representation, San Juan and Mandaluyong were represented under the province of Manila (1898–1899) and Rizal (1907–1941; 1945–1972) and the City of Greater Manila (1943–1944). These two municipalities were separated from the province to form the Metropolitan Manila Area on 7 November 1975 by virtue of Presidential Decree No. 824; Metro Manila was represented in the Interim Batasang Pambansa as Region IV from 1978 to 1984.

Among the amendments to the 1973 Constitution of the Philippines which were approved in the January 1984 plebiscite was a new apportionment ordinance for the election of Regular Batasang Pambansa members, as embodied in Batas Pambansa Blg. 643.  Under this apportionment ordinance, the municipalities of Mandaluyong and San Juan were grouped into a single parliamentary district which was allotted one representative, who was elected at large in the May 1984 elections. The combined representation of the two municipalities lasted until the abolition of the Regular Batasang Pambansa in the aftermath of the People Power Revolution in 1986.

Under the new Constitution which was proclaimed on 11 February 1987, the municipalities constituted the congressional district of San Juan–Mandaluyong, and elected its member to the restored House of Representatives starting that same year.

The enactment of Republic Act No. 7675 and its subsequent approval by plebiscite on 4 April 1994 converted Mandaluyong into a highly urbanized city. Per Section 49 of R.A. 7675 Mandaluyong was constituted into its own congressional district, which effectively created separate representation for San Juan as well. Both elected their separate representatives in the 1995 elections.

At-Large (defunct)
Municipalities: Mandaluyong, San Juan

Lone District (defunct)
Municipalities: Mandaluyong (became highly urbanized city 1994), San Juan

See also
Legislative districts of Rizal
Legislative district of Mandaluyong
Legislative district of San Juan

References

San Juan-Mandaluyong